Te Presento a Valentín (international title: This Is Valentin) is a Mexican soap opera produced by Ignacio Ortiz for Televisa.

Plot

Valentin is a fun, hardworking, passionate man who dreams of becoming editor of a magazine. He wishes to be able to find true love and form a family, but has yet to find the right woman.

What he doesn't know is that his life is about to change when, through fate, he meets Monserrat, a beautiful and noble woman who runs a charity called Fundación Aplícate.

Valentin and Monserrat are immediately attracted to one another and everything seems to be going smoothly until, in an act of desperation, Valentin creates an imaginary twin brother named Leo.

This white lie gets out of control, when Monserrat's sister, Karen, falls for Leo and is determined to fight for her love.

Although Valentin wishes to admit the truth, his kind spirit, economic pressures, and endless problems make this impossible. In an effort to help Piojito, the grandson of the caretaker of the building, Valentin is forced to continue his lie.

However, Valentin knows that his love for Monserrat is true, and he puts his best effort into their relationship with the constant support of his best friend, Manuel, a handsome, honest graphic designer. Valentin continues to fight for his love, even when this causes problems with Bruno, the finance manager at Fundación Aplícate, who is also in love with Monserrat.

Between constant bathroom trips, short breaks and several misunderstandings, Valentin still manages to pull off his double life as Leo. But as time passes, his need to tell the truth grows as the identity of Leo begins jeopardizing what he most desires: to live a happy life with Monserrat at his side.

Cast

References

2012 Mexican television series debuts
2013 Mexican television series endings
Mexican telenovelas